Mefou-et-Akono is a department of Centre Province in Cameroon.
The capital of the department lies at Ngoumou.

Subdivisions
The department is divided administratively into four communes and in turn into villages.

Communes 

 Akono
 Bikok
 Mbankomo
 Ngoumou

References

Departments of Cameroon
Centre Region (Cameroon)